Richard Benger was an English 16th-century university vice-chancellor,

Benger was a Doctor of Decretals and a Fellow of New College, Oxford. In 1520, Benger was appointed Vice-Chancellor of the University of Oxford.

References

Bibliography
 

Year of birth unknown
Year of death unknown
English Roman Catholics
English lawyers
Canon law jurists
Fellows of New College, Oxford
Vice-Chancellors of the University of Oxford
16th-century English lawyers